Forbes's snipe (Coenocorypha chathamica) was a species of New Zealand snipe endemic to the Chatham Islands. It was the larger of two species found there, the smaller being the surviving Chatham snipe. It was never seen alive by scientists and is known only from fossil material collected on the islands. Why it became extinct while its smaller relative survived is a mystery, as is the exact timing of its extinction, although it may have survived, unnoticed, until the 15th century.

References

Tennyson, A. & Martinson, P. (2006) Extinct Birds of New Zealand Te Papa Press,Wellington 
Worthy, Trevor H., & Holdaway, Richard N. (2002) The Lost World of the Moa, Indiana University Press:Bloomington,

External links
Forbes' snipe. Coenocorypha chathamica. by Paul Martinson. Artwork produced for the book Extinct Birds of New Zealand, by Alan Tennyson, Te Papa Press, Wellington, 2006

Forbes's snipe
Extinct birds of the Chatham Islands
Bird extinctions since 1500
Late Quaternary prehistoric birds
Forbes's snipe
Taxa named by Henry Ogg Forbes